The 1995 Australian Super Touring Championship was a CAMS sanctioned motor racing championship for 2 Litre Super Touring Cars. It was the third series for 2 litre Super Touring Cars to be contested in Australia, but the first to use the Australian Super Touring Championship name. It began on 5 March 1995 at Phillip Island Grand Prix Circuit and ended on 26 August at Eastern Creek Raceway after eight rounds.

The Drivers Championship was won by Paul Morris (BMW 318i), the Manufacturers Championship by BMW, the Teams Championship by BMW and the TOCA Privateers Cup by Graham Moore (Opel Vectra).

Teams and drivers
The following teams and drivers competed in the 1995 Australian Super Touring Championship.

Results and standings

Race calendar
The 1995 Australian Super Touring Championship was contested over eight rounds with two races per round.

Drivers Championship
Points were awarded on a 24-18-12-10-8-6-4-3-2-1 basis for the top ten positions in each race.

Manufacturers Championship

Teams Championship

TOCA Privateers Cup

Championship name
The championship was promoted by TOCA Australia as the 1995 2.0 L Super Touring Championship but is recognized by the Confederation of Australian Motor Sport as the 1995 Australian Super Touring Championship.

See also
1995 Australian Touring Car season

References

Further reading
 Australian Motor Racing Year, 1995

External links
 1995 Australian Super Touring Championship at www.supertouringregister.com
 1995 Touring Car racing images at www.autopics.com.au

Australian Super Touring Championship
Super Touring Car Championship